The Emperor & the Assassin is the third studio album by American hip hop duo Micranots, consisting of I Self Devine and DJ Kool Akiem. It was released February 3, 2004 on Rhymesayers Entertainment.

Music 
The album is entirely produced by DJ Kool Akiem. Guest appearances include Slug of Atmosphere, Muja Messiah and Malcolm.

Background 
When first creating the album, I Self Devine and DJ Kool Akiem had in mind to involve the album into present day news, and the name of the record was first named The Emperor & the Terrorist in response to the 9/11 attacks. However, the group decided to change the name when getting closer to release as to avoid any controversy.

Track listing

References

External links 
 The Emperor & the Assassin at Discogs

2004 albums
Micranots albums
Rhymesayers Entertainment albums